The Kendrick Baronetcy, of Whitley in the County of Berkshire, was a title in the Baronetage of England. It was created on 29 March 1679 for William Kendrick, grand-nephew of the famous cloth merchant and philanthropist, John Kendrick. The title became extinct on the death of the second Baronet in 1699.

Kendrick baronets, of Whitley (1679)
Sir William Kendrick, 1st Baronet (died 1684)
Sir William Kendrick, 2nd Baronet (1665–1699)

References

Extinct baronetcies in the Baronetage of England
People from Reading, Berkshire
1679 establishments in England